In the theory of formal languages, the pumping lemma for regular languages is a lemma that describes an essential property of all regular languages. Informally, it says that all sufficiently long strings in a regular language may be pumped—that is, have a middle section of the string repeated an arbitrary number of times—to produce a new string that is also part of the language.

This process of repetition is known as "pumping". Moreover, the pumping lemma guarantees that the length of  will be at most , imposing a limit on the ways in which  may be split. Finite languages vacuously satisfy the pumping lemma by having  equal to the maximum string length in  plus one.

The pumping lemma is useful for disproving the regularity of a specific language in question. It was first proven by Michael Rabin and Dana Scott in 1959, and rediscovered shortly after by Yehoshua Bar-Hillel, Micha A. Perles, and Eli Shamir in 1961, as a simplification of their pumping lemma for context-free languages.

Formal statement 
Let  be a regular language.

 
 
 

 is the substring that can be pumped (removed or repeated any number of times, and the resulting string is always in ).

In simple words, for any regular language , any sufficiently long string  (in ) can be split into 3 parts.
i.e.

Below is a formal expression of the Pumping Lemma.

Use of the lemma 
The pumping lemma is often used to prove that a particular language is non-regular: a proof by contradiction may consist of exhibiting a string (of the required length) in the language that lacks the property outlined in the pumping lemma.

For example, the language  over the alphabet  can be shown to be non-regular as follows:

Let , and  be as used in the formal statement for the pumping lemma above. Assume that some constant  exists as required by the lemma.
Moreover, because , it contains at least one instance of the letter . Therefore,  can not be regular.

The proof that the language of balanced (i.e., properly nested) parentheses is not regular follows the same idea.  Given , there is a string of balanced parentheses that begins with more than  left parentheses, so that  will consist entirely of left parentheses.  By repeating , a string can be produced that does not contain the same number of left and right parentheses, and so they cannot be balanced.

Proof of the pumping lemma 

For every regular language there is a finite state automaton (FSA) that accepts the language.  The number of states in such an FSA are counted and that count is used as the pumping length . For a string of length at least , let  be the start state and let  be the sequence of the next  states visited as the string is emitted.  Because the FSA has only  states, within this sequence of  visited states there must be at least one state that is repeated.  Write  for such a state.  The transitions that take the machine from the first encounter of state  to the second encounter of state  match some string.  This string is called  in the lemma, and since the machine will match a string without the  portion, or with the string  repeated any number of times, the conditions of the lemma are satisfied.

For example, the following image shows an FSA.

The FSA accepts the  string:  abcd.  Since this string has a length at least as large as the number of states, which is four, the pigeonhole principle indicates that there must be at least one repeated state among the start state and the next four visited states.  In this example, only  is a repeated state.  Since the substring bc takes the machine through transitions that start at state  and end at state , that portion could be repeated and the FSA would still accept, giving the string .  Alternatively, the bc portion could be removed and the FSA would still accept giving the string ad.  In terms of the pumping lemma, the string abcd is broken into an  portion a, a  portion bc and a  portion d.

As a side remark, the problem of checking whether a given string can be accepted by a given nondeterministic finite automaton without visiting any state repeatedly, is NP hard.

General version of pumping lemma for regular languages 

with strings ,  and  such that ,  and
From this, the above standard version follows a special case, with both  and  being the empty string.

Since the general version imposes stricter requirements on the language, it can be used to prove the non-regularity of many more languages.

Converse of lemma not true 
While the pumping lemma states that all regular languages satisfy the conditions described above, the converse of this statement is not true: a language that satisfies these conditions may still be non-regular. In other words, both the original and the general version of the pumping lemma give a necessary but not sufficient condition for a language to be regular.

For example, consider the following language:
.
In other words,  contains all strings over the alphabet  with a substring of length 3 including a duplicate character, as well as all strings over this alphabet where precisely 1/7 of the string's characters are 3's. Suppose some string s has length at least 5. Then, since the alphabet has only four characters, at least two of the first five characters in the string must be duplicates. They are separated by at most three characters.
 If the duplicate characters are separated by 0 characters, or 1, pump one of the other two characters in the string, which will not affect the substring containing the duplicates.
 If the duplicate characters are separated by 2 or 3 characters, pump 2 of the characters separating them. Pumping either down or up results in the creation of a substring of size 3 that contains 2 duplicate characters.
 The second condition of  ensures that  is not regular: Consider the string . This string is in  exactly when  and thus  is not regular by the Myhill–Nerode theorem.

The Myhill–Nerode theorem provides a test that exactly characterizes regular languages.  The typical method for proving that a language is regular is to construct either a finite state machine or a regular expression for the language.

See also 
 Ogden's lemma
 Pumping lemma for context-free languages
 Pumping lemma for regular tree languages

Notes

References 
 
 
  (See chapter 3.)
 

Formal languages
Lemmas
Finite automata

de:Pumping-Lemma#Reguläre Sprachen